Pacific is a city in King and Pierce counties in the State of Washington. Located primarily in King County, the population was 7,235 at the 2020 census.

History
Pacific was platted on April 10, 1906, by real estate promoter Clarence Dayton Hillman as "C.D. Hillman's Pacific City Addition to the City of Seattle". The development would take advantage of the nearby Puget Sound Electric Railway, which provided connections to Seattle and Tacoma. It was officially incorporated as a town on August 10, 1909.

In 1995, it annexed a portion of unincorporated Pierce County.

Record-breaking rains in November 2006 pushed the White River over its river banks along Pacific City Park, creating a temporary  lake.

In January 2009, release of stormwaters from the Mud Mountain Dam caused even greater flooding, inundating more than a hundred homes.

Geography

The lower White River, also known as the  Stuck River, runs through the east side of Pacific, between Auburn and Sumner.

Demographics

2010 census
As of the census of 2010, there were 6,606 people, 2,269 households, and 1,605 families living in the city. The racial makeup of the city was 69.2% White, 3.1% African American, 1.9% Native American, 9.0% Asian, 1.8% Pacific Islander, 8.5% from other races, and 6.4% from two or more races. Hispanic or Latino of any race were 15.1% of the population.

There were 2,269 households, of which 43.0% had children under the age of 18 living with them, 46.5% were married couples living together, 15.0% had a female householder with no husband present, 9.2% had a male householder with no wife present, and 29.3% were non-families. 20.9% of all households were made up of individuals, and 5.5% had someone living alone who was 65 years of age or older. The average household size was 2.88 and the average family size was 3.32.

The median age in the city was 32.8 years. 28.1% of residents were under the age of 18; 10.1% were between the ages of 18 and 24; 28.7% were from 25 to 44; 25.7% were from 45 to 64; and 7.2% were 65 years of age or older. The gender makeup of the city was 50.0% male and 50.0% female.

2000 census
As of the census of 2000, there were 5,527 people, 1,992 households, and 1,444 families living in the city. The population density was 2,158.1 people per square mile (833.6/km2). There were 2,090 housing units at an average density of 816.1 per square mile (315.2/km2). The racial makeup of the city was 85.38% White, 1.43% African American, 1.61% Native American, 4.72% Asian, 0.20% Pacific Islander, 2.95% from other races, and 3.71% from two or more races. Hispanic or Latino of any race were 6.48% of the population.

There were 1,992 households, out of which 44.2% had children under the age of 18 living with them, 49.8% were married couples living together, 15.3% had a female householder with no husband present, and 27.5% were non-families. 19.8% of all households were made up of individuals, and 3.2% had someone living alone who was 65 years of age or older. The average household size was 2.77 and the average family size was 3.16.

In the city, the population was spread out, with 31.2% under the age of 18, 9.5% from 18 to 24, 35.2% from 25 to 44, 18.7% from 45 to 64, and 5.4% who were 65 years of age or older. The median age was 31 years. For every 100 women there were 99.4 men. For every 100 women age 18 and over, there were 98.9 men.

The median income for a household in the city was $45,673, and the median income for a family was $47,694. Males had a median income of $36,594 versus $28,301 for females. The per capita income for the city was $18,228. About 7.9% of families and 10.8% of the population were below the poverty line, including 10.4% of those under age 18 and none of those age 65 or over.

Government

The town has a mayor, city council and police department.

2009 flooding
On January 8, 2009, the Army Corps of Engineers released water from Mud Mountain Dam into the White River. The action was done to relieve pressure in the reservoir, which had reached its capacity due to heavy rain that was causing flooding around the Puget Sound region. A large amount of water was released very quickly, causing rapid and massive flooding in Pacific. Those affected had virtually no notice of the impending disaster. One of those affected by the flooding was noted local and international musician Jerry Miller, a founding member of Moby Grape, who had recently moved to Pacific from Tacoma. Miller lost virtually all of his possessions, including over forty years of memorabilia from his music career.  Assistance to those affected by the flooding was provided by the Federal Emergency Management Agency (FEMA).

References

External links

 City of Pacific's Web Site

Cities in King County, Washington
Cities in Pierce County, Washington
Cities in the Seattle metropolitan area
Cities in Washington (state)